Lucy Barnes may refer to:

Lucy Barnes (writer) (1780–1809), American author of The Female Christian
Lucy Barnes Brown (1859–1921), early American amateur golfer
Lacy Barnes-Mileham (born 1964), U.S. track and field Olympian